Newport Barracks, North Carolina were located near the town of Shepherdsville (now Newport, North Carolina), near the site of an early defensive fortification built in the 1830s.  The camp was near the tracks of the Atlantic and Coastal Railroad and paralleled a creek that led to the Newport River (which in turn leads to Beaufort Inlet).

The camp was heavily fortified by occupying Union forces based in New Bern following the battle on March 14, 1862, and was guarded by Fort Benjamin, a small earthwork defensive structure with 6- and 12-pound cannon armament.  Primary occupants of the site were infantry and artillery units from Massachusetts, Vermont, Connecticut and Rhode Island.

The site was overrun by Confederate forces on February 2, 1864, and briefly held.

As of 2006, no remains are visible and the site is adjacent to a strawberry farm and electrical power substation.  A historical marker is located on Old U.S. 70 before the bridge as a traveler enters the town of Newport from the east.

References

North Carolina in the American Civil War
1862 establishments in North Carolina